Un uomo in ginocchio (internationally released as A Man on His Knees) is a 1979 Italian crime-drama film directed by Damiano Damiani. For his performance Giuliano Gemma won the Grolla d'oro for Best Actor.

Cast 
Giuliano Gemma: Nino Peralta
Michele Placido: Platamona
Eleonora Giorgi: Peralta's wife
Tano Cimarosa: Colicchia
Ettore Manni: Don Vincenzo Fabbricante
Luciano Catenacci: Policeman 
Nello Pazzafini: Patranka
Nazzareno Zamperla

References

External links

1979 films
Italian crime drama films
Films directed by Damiano Damiani
1979 crime drama films
1970s Italian films